The Funeral Pudding is an EP by the band Thinking Fellers Union Local 282, released in February 1994 through Ajax Records.

Track listing

Personnel 
Thinking Fellers Union Local 282
Mark Davies – instruments
Anne Eickelberg – instruments
Brian Hageman – instruments
Jay Paget – instruments
Hugh Swarts – instruments, answering machine message on "The Invitation"
Production and additional personnel
Greg Freeman – production, engineering
Matt Hall – painting
Thinking Fellers Union Local 282 – production

References

External links 
 

1994 EPs
Thinking Fellers Union Local 282 albums